St. Alban's College is a private, boarding, English medium and day high school for boys situated in the suburb of Lynnwood Glen in Pretoria in the Gauteng province of South Africa. It was founded in 1963 by Anton Murray. Its history, influence, wealth, and academic reputation have made it one of the most prestigious schools in South Africa. The sister school is called St. Mary's Diocesan School for Girls, Pretoria.

History 

The school was founded on 1 February 1963 with a student body of 37 boys and 3 masters. It now has 580 boys and 43 teachers plus support staff.

The founder-Headmaster, Anton Murray, was a South African cricketer, who worked for twenty years at the school. Paul Marsh was headmaster during a transitional phase lasting for four years. Ronnie Todd introduced many radical changes during his ten years as headmaster, and following his position as headmaster went on to open St Peter's College. The fourth headmaster was Grant Nupen, who was one of the 37 Foundation Scholars in 1963 and went on to become the first Head Boy, a position he held for three years.

Under the direction of the fifth headmaster, Tom Hamilton, the school celebrated its 50th birthday in 2013.

Headmasters

Sport 
Sports offered include rugby and hockey (the main sports in the winter time), cricket, swimming, rowing, basketball and water polo (in summer). Other sports are golf, soccer, tennis, squash, athletics and cross-country running (also known as bounds).

The sports that are played at the school are:   
 Archery
 Athletics
 Basketball
 Chess 
 Cricket 
 Cross country
 Golf
 Hockey
 Mountain biking 
 Rowing
 Rugby
 Football (soccer)
 Squash
 Swimming
 Table tennis
 Tennis 
 Water polo

Music

The St Alban's College chapel choir attended the World Choir Games for the first time in the school's history in 2008. In 2010, the choir completed a tour of the United States, where it toured the East Coast and performed at places including the Washington National Cathedral in Washington D.C.

The school has a singing group, the Barbershop Boys, comprising singers selected from the chapel choir, usually around 15-20 boys, who sing a cappella. The Barbershop Boys began the school's "Music Tours" with their tour to Argentina in 2004.

Notable Old Boys 
List of the matriculants of St Alban's College are in alphabetical order. 

 Mlungisi Bali (Class of 2009) - South African professional rugby player 
 Roger Goode - Radio DJ
 Jean-Philip Grobler (Class of 2001) - AKA St. Lucia, front-man for the band St. Lucia (musician)
 Kurt Haupt (Class of 2007) - South African-German rugby player
 Jason Jenkins (Class of 2013) - Springbok and Blue Bulls rugby player
 Michael Kumbirai (Class of 2014) - South African professional rugby player
 Bongi Mbonambi (Class of 2009) Springbok professional rugby player 
 Simon Miller (Class of 2019) - South African professional rugby player
 Abongile Nonkontwana (Class of 2013) - South African professional rugby player
 David Rattray (Class of 1976) - historian, fellow of the Royal Geographical Society (1958 – 2007)
 John Smith (Class of 2008) - Olympic gold medalist for Rowing, light weight coxless four, 2012 London Olympics.
 Richard Sterne (Class of 1999) - South African professional golfer
 Jabulani Tsambo (Class of 1998) - South African hip-hop artist
 Dan van Zyl (Class of 1989) - South African professional cricket & rugby player

References

External links 
 
 

Anglican schools in South Africa
Boarding schools in South Africa
Private schools in Gauteng
Boys' schools in South Africa
Schools in Pretoria
Educational institutions established in 1963
1963 establishments in South Africa